Nyhavn 5 is an 18th-century property overlooking the Nyhavn canal in central Copenhagen, Denmark. It was listed in the Danish registry of protected buildings and places in 1945. Notable former residents include the actor Adam Gottlob Gielstrup, opera singer Peter Schram and businessman Cornelius Peter August Koch.

History

18th century

The property was listed in Copenhagen's first cadastre of 1689 as No. 3 in St. Ann's East Quarter. It was owned by court smith Peder Olsen at that time. The present building on the site was constructed before 1736. The property was again  listed as No. 3 in St. Ann's East Quarter in the new cadastre of 1756. It was owned by  Vilhelm Zahn's widow at that time.

The property was shortly thereafter acquired by barkeeper Lorentz Svendsen. A new rear wing was constructed for him in 1757. The front wing was heightened some time between 1757 and 1791. The building was from 1764 operated as a boarding house under the name Stadt Hamburg. Parrots and other colourful birds were also sold from the building.  The actor Adam Gottlob Gielstrup (1753-1830)resided in one of the apartments from 1780 to 1782.

The property was home to 14 residents in two households at the 1787 census. Peter Knudsen, a beer seller (øltapper), resided in the building with his wife Inger Niels Datter, their 25-year-old daughter Johanne and five lodgers (all merchants, aged 22 to 41). Ole Jacobsen, a barkeeper, resided in the building with his wife Maria Pouls Datter, their three children (aged 13 to 18) and one maid.

Hans Jørgen Ernst
 
The property was later acquired by merchant Hans Jørgen Ernst (1752-1825). His property was home to 27 residents in four househollds at the 1801 census. Ernst resided in one of the apartments with his wife Anne Marie West, their daughters Henriette and Emilie (aged five and seven), 61-year-old Claus Jørgensen Holm, one apprentice, two maids and two students (lodgers). Niels Bertelsen, a barkeeper, resided in the building with his wife Ane Christensdatter, their four children (aged two to 11), one maid and one lodger. Peter Borgesen, a carpenter, resided in the building with the sailor Rasmus Bossen and the mate H. C. L. Keding.

The property was again listed in the new cadastre of 1806 as No. 3 in St. Ann's East Quarter. It was still owned by Ernst at that time.

1810s
The merchant Lauritz Fussing Schramm and his wife Marie Sophie Schramm (mée Wexschall) resided in the building in the late 1810s. They were the parents of opera singer Peter Schram (1819-1895). He was born in the building on 5 September 1819.

Hess and Foght
The property was home to 47 residents in seven households at the 1834 census. Peter Mathias Hess, a captain (skibsfører), resided on the second floor  with his four children (aged 10 to 17), his sister Henriette Albertine Frederikke Hess (acting as his housekeeper), his brother's 17-year-old daughter Sophie Cecilie Hess and one maid. Marius Christian Ager, a lackey for  Princess Juliane Sophie, resided on the first floor with his wife Anna Wilhelmine Lanckau, their four children (aged 11 to 27), one lodger and one maid. Carl Peter Foght (1802-1884), a master goldsmith (since 1824), resided on the ground floor with his wife Anna Foght (née Knudsen), their four children (aged three to eight), one more goldsmith (employee), one apprentice and one maid. Hans Hansen Møller, a workman, resided in the basement with his wife Johanne Maria Møller (née Møller), their three children (aged two to 10). barkeeper Peter Larsen Bræningerrø, one lodger (workman) and one maid. Jakop Matias Berrig, a goldsmith (probably employed by Foght), resided on the second floor of the rear wing with his wife Ceselie Berrig (née Tofte) and their two children (aged two and five). Ane Nørregaard, a laundry lady (widow), resided on the second floor of the rear wing (to the right) with the workman Nels Frederrig Olsen	 (possibly her son) and two foster daughters. Anne Marie Smidt (née Kifer), a cleaning lady (widow), resided on the first floor of the rear wing with her four children (aged eight to 19) and a foster daughter from the Poor Authority.

Hess and Foght were both still residing in the building at the time of the 1840 census. Hess resided in the second-floor apartment with his sister, two children (aged 18 and 22) and one maid. Carl Peter Foght resided in the ground-floor apartment with his wife, their seven children (aged two to 14), his brother (goldsmith, employee), his wife's sisters Sophie (aged 45) and Juliane (aged 38), one apprentice and one maid. Peter Christian Stendrup, a customs official, resided on the first floor with his wife Maria Charlotte Amalie Stendrup (née Bertelsen), their six children (aged two to 14) and one maid. Lars Petersen. a grocer (høker), resided in the basement with his wife Ane Kerstine Petersen /née Hapso) and one maid. Nils Hansen, a singer, resided on the first floor of the rear wing with his wife Marie Catrin Hansen (née Jonas) and their two children (aged three and five). Jens Jensen, a workman, resided on the second floor of the rear wing with his wife Maren Jensen (née Petersdatter), a wiwodw (possibly his sister) and the widow's four-year-old son.

Cornelius Peter August Koch
The businessman ((grosserer)  Cornelius Peter August Koch acquired the property in the late 1840s. His property was home to six households at the time of the 1850 census. Koch resided on the second floor with his wife Wilhelmine Henritte Jørs, one male servant, one maid, two young widows and one of the widow's four-year-old son. Johann Daniel Henrich Jørs (ca. 1791–1859), a master baker and Koch's father-in-law, resided on the first floor with his wife Agnete (née  Weidemann) and three of their children (aged 15 and 33). Anders Jens Christensen, a barkeeoer, resided in the basement with his wife Ane Olsen. their 14-year-old son and one maid. Ole Jensen, a sailor, resided on the ground floor of the rear wing with his wife Birgitte Mikkelsen, their three children (aged seven to 12) and one lodger. Jens Lind, a tailor, resided on the first floor of the rear wing with his wife Ane Dorthea Suekov, their one-year-old son and one lodger. Christense Johanne Petersen, a laundry lady (widow), resided in the garret of the rear wing.

Koch founded Det almindelige danske Dampskibsselskab in 1856.

Koch was still the owner of the building at the time of the 1860 census. He resided in the second-floor apartment with his wife and one maid. His mother-in-law Augusta Jørs, who had become a widow in 1859, resided on the ground floor with her son Wilhelm Carl Heinrich Jørs and one maid. Louise Bine Lund, an officer's widow, resided in the building with two daughters, a grandson and one maid. Peter Petersen, a new barkeeper, resided in the basement with his wife Anne Sophie Petersen (mée Hansen) and one maid. The tenants of the rear wing comprised a tailor, a workman and three widows.

20th century
The White Star Line operated a ticket office in the building. It was for a while also located at Nyhavn 1.

Architecture
Nyhavn 5 is constructed with four storeyys over a walk-out basement. The five-bays wide facade is plastered and painted in a light blue colour. It is finished with a white-painted sill course below the first-floor windiws, a through-going white sill course below the three central windows of the second floor and a white painted modilioned cornice. The main entrance is located in the bay furthest to the east. The pitched red tile roof features three dormer windows towards the street. A side wing with the building's secondary staircase extends from the rear side of the building along the east side of the asymmetrically shaped courtyard and is again attached to a three-storey rear wing. The rear wing and the upper floors of the front wing are towards the yard constructed with timber framing, whereas the side wing is constructed in brick. All three wings are towards the yard painted iron vitriol uellow.

Today
The building is today owned by the restaurateur Peter Thorstrup via the firm M/S Øresund A/S. Myhavns Færgekro, a restaurant, is based on the ground floor and in the basement of the building. The black-and-white floor tiles are from the foyer of the Dahmar Theatre on the City Hall Square. The cast-iron spiral staircase that connects the two floors of the restaurant is from a tram of the Frederiksberg Tramway Company.

References

External links

 Nyhavns Færgekro
 Peder Matthias Hess at skippere.dk

Listed residential buildings in Copenhagen